The Diocese of Argyll and The Isles is in the west of Scotland, and is one of the seven dioceses of the Scottish Episcopal Church. It is perhaps the largest of the dioceses, but has the smallest number of church members. As a united diocese, Argyll and The Isles has two cathedrals: St John's in Oban and the Cathedral of The Isles in Millport, Isle of Cumbrae.

The Diocese of the Isles, by itself, was founded by Patrick in 900, and the Diocese of Argyll was founded by Bishop Harald in 1193. During the Scottish Reformation, most of the heritage and jurisdiction of the church was given to the Church of Scotland. However, the small Scottish Episcopal Church claims to have maintained the line of bishops of both dioceses through to the present day. In the seventeenth century, the Diocese of the Isles was united with the dioceses of Caithness and Orkney, and, in 1819, was separated from them to unite with the Diocese of Argyll. In 1878, the Roman Catholic Church created a Diocese of Argyll and the Isles. The diocese is responsible for the only two Episcopalian retreat houses in Scotland (Bishop's House Iona and the College of the Holy Spirit at the Cathedral of The Isles). 
Keith Riglin, Vice Dean of King's College London, was elected by an Electoral Synod on 30 January 2021; his consecration was on 1 May 2021.

The Diocese of Argyll and The Isles is twinned with the Anglican Diocese of Zanzibar (Anglican Church of Tanzania) and the Episcopal Diocese of Delaware (Episcopal Church in the United States of America).

Area and population 
The diocese covers the historic counties of Argyllshire (population 60,000) and Buteshire (population 12,500), the Hebridean parts of Inverness-shire and Ross and Cromarty (population 38,000), and the Lochaber area of Inverness-shire (population 16,500). This total population of approximately 127,000 makes it the smallest British Anglican diocese by population apart from the Diocese of Sodor and Man. It gives the diocese a ratio of one priest to every 18,100 inhabitants and one church to every 3,850 inhabitants.

Deans of the diocese

Secessions 
On 24 November 2017 the congregation of Christ Church, Harris, a Scottish Episcopal church in the Western Isles, announced that they could no longer remain under the oversight of their local bishop, Kevin Pearson, then-Bishop of Argyll and The Isles, owing to his support of the SEC's approval of same-sex marriage. They would instead be receiving the episcopal ministry of Andy Lines, the Missionary Bishop to Europe of the Anglican Church in North America. Daniel Davies, the priest-in-charge of Christ Church, resigned his SEC position on 22 January 2018.

Churches 
The diocese currently has 8 stipendiary clergy (including the Bishop who is also the Provost of Cumbrae Cathedral) and 32 active churches.

Former congregation

Closed churches in the diocese area

References

Argyll and The Isles
Religion in Argyll and Bute
1819 establishments in Scotland